25 Hz Power Transmission System may refer to:

 Amtrak's 25 Hz traction power system
 SEPTA's 25 Hz traction power system